Derek Christopher Price (born August 12, 1972) is a former American football tight end who played for the Detroit Lions of the National Football League (NFL). He played college football at University of Iowa.

He is the CEO of Desert Hope Treatment Center, an American Addiction Centers rehab facility in Las Vegas, Nevada.

References 

1972 births
Living people
Sportspeople from Tempe, Arizona
Players of American football from Arizona
American football tight ends
Iowa Hawkeyes football players
Detroit Lions players